The Hawaiian Ladies Open was a golf tournament on the LPGA Tour from 1987 to 2001. It was played at three different courses on the Hawaiian island of Oahu.

Tournament courses
1987–1989 Turtle Bay Resort, Kahuku, Hawaii
1990–1995 Ko Olina Golf Club, 'Ewa Beach, Hawaii
1996–2001 Kapolei Golf Course, Kapolei, Hawaii

Winners
Cup Noodles Hawaiian Ladies Open
2001 Catriona Matthew
2000 Betsy King

Sunrise Hawaiian Ladies Open
1999 Alison Nicholas

Cup Noodles Hawaiian Ladies Open
1998 Wendy Ward
1997 Annika Sörenstam
1996 Meg Mallon
1995 Barb Thomas
1994 Marta Figueras-Dotti

Itoki Hawaiian Ladies Open
1993 Lisa Walters
1992 Lisa Walters

Orix Hawaiian Ladies Open
1991 Patty Sheehan
1990 Beth Daniel
1989 Sherri Turner

Orient Leasing Hawaiian Ladies Open
1988 Ayako Okamoto

Tsumura Hawaiian Ladies Open
1987 Cindy Rarick

References

Former LPGA Tour events
Golf in Hawaii
Recurring sporting events established in 1987
Recurring sporting events disestablished in 2001
1987 establishments in Hawaii
2001 disestablishments in Hawaii
History of women in Hawaii